I Loved You at Your Darkest is the eleventh studio album by Polish extreme metal band Behemoth, released on 5 October 2018.

Reception

Like its predecessor, The Satanist, I Loved You at Your Darkest was met with universal acclaim from music critics. Wall of Sound gave the album a perfect 10/10 review and said: "They have taken their sound, their style and their dynamic, as well as the best of their influences and put forth something that is beyond otherworldly." The album was also nominated for 'Best Album' at the 2019 Kerrang! Awards.

Track listing

Charts

Credits

Behemoth
Nergal – lead guitar, lead vocals 
Orion – bass, backing vocals
Inferno – drums

Technical staff
Haldor Grunberg – engineer
Ignacy Gruszecki – engineer
Heinrich (Filip Hałucha) – engineer
Dariusz Budkiewicz – engineer
Sebastian Has – engineer
Tomasz Budkiewicz – engineer
Bartosz Rogalewicz – design (sigil), drawings and layout
Denis Forkas Kostromitin – calligraphy
Jan Stokłosa – orchestral arrangements
Matt Hyde – mixing
Nicola Samori – cover art
Tom Baker – mastering

Guests
Seth – rhythm guitar
Dziablas (Jan Galbas) – backing vocals
Filip Wozniakowski – oboe
Krzysztof Lenczowski – cello
Maciej Chyży – bass trombone
Michał Łapaj – hammond organ
Michał Sobuś – double bass
Seweryn Zaplatynski – flute
Siegmar (Krzysztof  Oloś) – samples
Sylwia Mróz – viola
Waldemar Zarow – clarinet
Wawrzyniec Dramowicz – percussion
Gabriel Czopka – horn
Igor Szeligowski – horn
Marek Michalec – horn
Anna Szalińska – piccolo
Paulina Mastyło-Falkiewicz – piccolo
Karol Gadja] – trombone
Piotr Tchórzewski – trombone
Ostap Popowicz – trumpet
Paweł Wróblewski – trumpet

References

2018 albums
Behemoth (band) albums
Metal Blade Records albums
Nuclear Blast albums
Mystic Production albums